William Gage Brady Jr. (December 20, 1887 – October 9, 1966) was a chairman of the National City Bank of New York, a predecessor of Citibank.

Biography 
Brady was born in New York City on December 20, 1887, to William Gage Brady Sr. (1856–1917).

He attended Trinity School and received a B.A. in 1908  from Columbia University.

He married Marion N. Kennedy.

He worked at Bankers Trust until 1914. He then went to work at National City Bank.  He was in charge of domestic operations in 1938, president in 1940, and chairman in 1948.

He died on October 9, 1966, at Memorial Mission Hospital in Asheville, North Carolina.

References 

1880s births
1966 deaths
Columbia College (New York) alumni
Citigroup people
Trinity School (New York City) alumni
20th-century American businesspeople
American bankers